U 15 is located inside Ekerö church. It was previously part of the stone floor in the church but has since been put on display. It is assumed that Ingeborg lived at old Asknäs estate that is located close to the church. The stone is also referred to as the Ingeborg-stone. Although the stone uses the rune alphabet, the inscription itself is in Latin.

See also
List of runestones

References

Uppland Runic Inscription 0015
Runestones raised in memory of women